Umo Bassey Eno (b 10 May 1964) known as Pastor Bassy Eno is a Nigerian clergy and politician, who was recently declared the governor-elect of Akwa Ibom State. He's the immediate past Commissioner for lands and water resources in Akwa Ibom State, and the founder of All Nations Christian Ministry International

Early life and education
Umo Eno was born on May 10, 1964, in his hometown, Ikot Ekpene in Nsit-Ubium Local Government Area of Akwa Ibom State. He attended Local Authority primary school in Lagos State, where he got his first school leaving certificate. He also attend St. Francis secondary school in Eket, Akwa Ibom State and Victory High School in Ikeja, Lagos State for his secondary education. He obtained a Bachelor's degree in Public administration from the University of Uyo and later a Master's degree in same field.

Career
After his secondary school education, he was employed to work in Union bank for some years before moving to Bertola Machine Tools Nigeria Limited and then to Norman Holdings Limited, where he became the chief executive officer before setting up Royalty groups, which belongs to him. In 2021, he was appointed Commissioner for lands and water resources in Akwa Ibom State by governor Udom Emmanuel and was later relieved from his position so he could focus on the governorship race.

References 

1964 births
People from Akwa Ibom State
Living people